Francis J. Rush (May 25, 1921 – June 15, 1985) was a Democratic member of the Pennsylvania House of Representatives.

References

Democratic Party members of the Pennsylvania House of Representatives
1985 deaths
1921 births
20th-century American politicians